Kunsthalle Emden (Henri and Eske Nannen Foundation, Donation Otto Van de loo) is a German art museum in Emden in East Frisia, Germany.

The museum's collections include more than 1,500 works.

History 
In 1986, Henri Nannen (1913–1996) commissioned a building for his collection of 20th-century art in Emden, his home town. The core of the collection includes German Expressionism with works by Nolde, Macke and Kokoschka. In October 2000 the Munich art dealer and collector Otto van de Loo donated his collection to Kunsthalle Emden.

Provenance research and collection 
Provenance research into the Nannen donation pointed to some problematic artworks. An artwork from the Ismar Littmann art collection, which had confiscated by the Gestapo, was restituted.

In 2002 a settlement was reached concerning a painting by Emil Nolde with the heirs of Mr. Wurzburger, who, along with his wife, was murdered by Nazis in the Holocaust. The painting had been seized by a Nazi appraiser and disappeared until it reappeared in the Kuntshalle in Emden, where" it arrived as a bequest from the Henri Nannen Foundation".

See also 

 Kunsthalle

References 

Museums established in 1986
Art museums and galleries in Germany